The Church of Jesus Christ of Latter-day Saints in Missouri refers to the Church of Jesus Christ of Latter-day Saints and its members in Missouri.
The official church membership as a percentage of general population was 1.14% in 2014. According to the 2014 Pew Forum on Religion & Public Life survey, roughly 1% of Missourians self-identify themselves most closely with The Church of Jesus Christ of Latter-day Saints. The LDS Church is the 8th largest denomination in Missouri.

Stakes are located in Cape Girardeau, Columbia, Far West, Hazelwood, Independence, Joplin, Kansas City, Lake St Louis, Liberty, Monett, Platte City, St Louis (2), St Robert, Springfield (2), Warrensburg, and West Plains.

History

In 1831, Joseph Smith told LDS Church members that Independence, Missouri, was to be the gathering spot for the church.

There were many Mormons in Missouri and it served as one of the headquarters of the Church of Jesus Christ of Latter-day Saints in the 1830s.  In 1838 Lilburn W. Boggs issued the Extermination Order to drive Mormons from the state, and for a time there was no organized Church presence here.

Later in the 1840s members of the Church, both immigrants from Britain and migrants from Nauvoo, Illinois moved to St. Louis, Missouri and a branch was organized there in 1844.  In 1852 the steamship Saluda exploded near Lexington, Missouri with many of those killed being Latter-day Saints headed towards Fremont, Nebraska to then outfit to go to Utah.

By 1849 there were over 3,000 Latter-day Saints in the St. Louis area, and in 1854 a stake was organized there with Milo Andrus as president.  Among those baptized in Missouri about this time was Henry Eyring a German immigrant who would later lead Latter-day Saint missionary efforts among the Cherokee in Oklahoma and many of whose descendants would be prominent later in the LDS Church.  In 1858 the stake was dissolved and most of the Mormons migrated to Utah.

In the late 19th century, there was limited missionary presence.  However, from 1904 a mission was headquartered in Independence.  In 1911 a branch was organized there with Joseph F. Smith dedicating a chapel in 1914.  Shortly after this Spencer W. Kimball, later president of the Church, served a mission in Missouri.

The church began to expand in the 1920s with five new chapels dedicated in 1926 and 1927.  The first Missouri stake was organized in Kansas City in 1956 with another organized in St. Louis in 1958.  Columbia, Missouri got a stake in 1970, the Independence Stake was split from the Kansas City stake in 1971 and a stake was organized in Springfield in 1973.  The first LDS temple in Missouri was dedicated by Gordon B. Hinckley in the St. Louis area in 1997.

For much of the early 20th century Liahona The Elders' Journal was published in Independence, Missouri this was the main LDS publication aimed at church members living in the United States outside of the Mormon corridor.

In 2010, the Kansas City Missouri Temple was dedicated—the temple stands not far from Liberty, Missouri where LDS Church founder Joseph Smith Jr. was incarcerated in the winter of 1838–39.

Stakes

As of February 2023, Missouri was home to the following stakes:

Missions

Temples

Missouri currently has two operating temples and three in which construction has been indefinitely suspended.

See also

 The Church of Jesus Christ of Latter-day Saints membership statistics (United States)
Missouri: Religion
 Independence, Missouri
 Jackson County, Missouri
 Far West, Missouri
 Adam-ondi-Ahman
 Caldwell County, Missouri
 Daviess County, Missouri
 Mormon War (1838)
 Haun's Mill massacre
 Extermination order
 Liberty Jail
 Evening and Morning Star
 Joseph Smith
 Zion's Camp

References

External links
 Newsroom (Missouri)
 ComeUntoChrist.org Latter-day Saints Visitor site
 The Church of Jesus Christ of Latter-day Saints Official site

 
Latter Day Saint movement in Missouri